The folE RNA motif, now known as the THF-II riboswitch, is a conserved RNA structure that was discovered by bioinformatics.
folE motifs are found in Alphaproteobacteria.

folE motif RNAs likely function as cis-regulatory elements, in view of their positions upstream of protein-coding genes.
Instances of the folE RNA motif are often located nearby to the predicted Shine-Dalgarno sequence of the downstream gene.  This arrangement is consistent with a model of cis-regulation where the RNA allosterically controls access to the Shine-Dalgarno sequence, thus regulating the gene translationally.
All known folE RNAs are present upstream of genes encoding GTP cyclohydrolase I, which performs a step in folate metabolism.  

folE RNAs have been shown to bind tetrahydrofolate and related molecules, leading to their designation as a second structural class of tetrahydrofolate riboswitches, called THF-II riboswitches.

References

Non-coding RNA